Perkiomen may refer to one of the following entities, all located in Montgomery County, Pennsylvania, unless stated otherwise:

Communities
 Perkiomen Junction, a neighborhood of Phoenixville, Pennsylvania, in Chester County
 Perkiomen Township, Montgomery County, Pennsylvania, a township of the second class
 Perkiomenville, Pennsylvania, an unincorporated community

Schools
 Perkiomen School, a private school in Pennsburg
 Perkiomen Valley Academy, an alternative educational center in Frederick
 Perkiomen Valley School District
 Upper Perkiomen High School, a public school in Pennsburg
 Upper Perkiomen School District

Other
 Perkiomen Valley Airport, in Collegeville
 Perkiomen Creek, in Berks, Lehigh and Montgomery counties
 East Branch Perkiomen Creek, a tributary of Perkiomen Creek
 Perkiomen Bridge, in Collegeville
 Perkiomen Bridge Hotel, an adjacent historic hotel complex
 Perkiomen Trail, which runs along Perkiomen Creek

See also
 Perquimans County, North Carolina